Peter VI was the Greek Patriarch of Alexandria some time between the 7th and 8th centuries.

References

7th-century Patriarchs of Alexandria